Hufstedler Gravehouse or Pinckney's Tomb is a grave shelter, or grave house, near Linden, Tennessee, that is considered to be the largest grave house in the U.S. state of Tennessee. It is listed on the National Register of Historic Places.

The grave house is a limestone and wood structure that covers the burial site of local farmer Pinckney Hufstedler and members of his family. Wooden walls and a roof were added because of Pinckney Hufstedler's fears that water could get into his tomb. Hufstedler also asked that his body be transported to the burial site in a wagon drawn by white oxen, rather than mules.

The structure is deemed to be a rare example of vernacular rural cemetery architecture of the 19th century. It was listed on the National Register of Historic Places in 1987. In 2009, the Tennessee Preservation Trust listed it as one of the state's ten most endangered historic sites, noting that the foundation was beginning to fail.

References

External links
 

Cemeteries on the National Register of Historic Places in Tennessee
Buildings and structures completed in 1885
Buildings and structures in Perry County, Tennessee
Vernacular architecture in Tennessee
National Register of Historic Places in Perry County, Tennessee